Choco Taco was a Good Humor-Breyers ice cream novelty resembling a taco. It consisted of a disk of waffle cone material folded to resemble a hard taco shell, reduced-fat vanilla ice cream, artificially flavored fudge, peanuts, and a milk chocolate coating. The "Choco Taco" was marketed under the Klondike brand as "The Best Ice Cream Taco". 

Klondike discontinued the Choco Taco in 2022.

History
The Choco Taco was invented in Philadelphia in 1983 by Alan Drazen, Senior Vice President of the Jack and Jill Ice Cream Company. It was first rolled out in 1984 when it became popular in mobile vending trucks and convenience stores. It made its first appearance in supermarkets nationwide when Good Humor-Breyers (who were manufacturing it in Richmond, Virginia) promoted it in 1996 as "America's coolest taco," at the Supermarket Industry Convention in Chicago.

In 1998, Unilever introduced the Choco Taco to Italy under the name Winner Taco through its subsidiary Algida. In 1999 it was introduced in Sweden through another subsidiary, GB Glace, under the same name. In 2000 the Winner Taco was retired from the Italian and Swedish markets. After two years of campaigning by Taco fans however, in January 2014 Algida announced on their Facebook page the return of the Winner Taco in Italy. GB Glace also re-introduced the ice cream to Sweden in 2014.

In 1999, the company improved the product, incorporating a shell which stayed crisper, and introduced new packaging. The same year, the company introduced a Klondike Cookies & Cream Choco Taco, containing cookies and cream ice cream and covered with cookie pieces. Choco Tacos were also sold at some Taco Bell restaurants.

Klondike discontinued the Choco Taco in July 2022. According to an Associated Press fact check, Klondike discontinued the product due to a sharp increase in demand across its brands and to ensure the availability of the remainder of its products. However, Klondike Tweeted that “we are discussing next steps, including what to do with the last 912 (we counted) tacos at HQ. Stay tuned…” on July 28 2022, and the Tweet was still pinned as of August 30, 2022.

Reddit founder Alexis Ohanian, who runs the venture capital firm 776, tweeted at Unilever, offering to buy the rights to the product, and in a July 26 interview said that he has spoken with Unilever, but  didn't yet have any news to share.

References

External links
 

American brands
Ice cream brands
Unilever brands
Taco
Products introduced in 1983
Products and services discontinued in 2022